Smoking in Chicago is regulated by the Smoke Free Illinois Act since 2008 as well as  its own Clean Indoor Air Ordinance since 1988 and  the Chicago Clean Indoor Air Act from 2014.

Law
As of January 16, 2006 smoking is prohibited in:

All enclosed workplaces;
All restaurants without a bar area;
All restaurant areas more than 15 feet from the bar counter;
Public places including government buildings, convention facilities, laundromats, public transportation facilities and shopping malls;
Public restrooms, lobbies, reception areas, hallways and other common use areas in public buildings, apartment buildings and condominium buildings;
Within 15 feet of the entrance to enclosed public places;
Recreational areas including enclosed sports arenas, stadiums, swimming pools, ice and roller rinks, arcades and bowling alleys; and
City government vehicles

As of July 1, 2008 smoking is  prohibited in:
All Restaurants, including Restaurants with Bar Areas; and
All Bars and Taverns

The Chicago Department of Public Health  has primary responsibility for enforcing the laws.

E-cigarette ban
The current  version  Chicago Clean Indoor Air Act prohibits tobacco smoking as well as "vaping" or the use of an e-cigarette, vape pen, or e-hookah in virtually all enclosed public places and enclosed places of employment.

The places where smoking and the use of e-cigarettes is prohibited includes:
bars and restaurants;
shopping malls;
recreational facilities including enclosed sports arenas, stadiums, swimming pools, ice and roller rinks, arcades and bowling alleys;
concert halls;
auditoriums;
convention facilities;
government buildings and vehicles;
public transportation facilities;
coin laundries;
meeting rooms;
private clubs;
public restrooms;
lobbies; reception areas, hallways and other common-use areas in public buildings, apartment buildings and condominium buildings.

References

Health in Illinois
Smoking in the United States
Chicago